Garvin is both a surname and a given name of Irish origin. Notable people with the name include:

Surname:
Alexander Garvin, noted American urban planner, educator, and author
Anita Garvin (1906–1994), American actress
Clifton C. Garvin (born 1922), former President and CEO of Exxon
James Garvin (basketball) (born 1950)
James Louis Garvin (1868–1947), British journalist
Jimmy Garvin (born 1952), former professional wrestler
Jonathan Garvin (born 1999), American football player
Lucius F. C. Garvin, former governor of Rhode Island
Rex Garvin (1940–2013), American singer and musician
Ron Garvin, Canadian professional wrestler and referee
Samuel B. Garvin (1811–1878), New York lawyer
Stephen Garvin (1826–1874), Irish recipient of the Victoria Cross
Ted Garvin (1923–1992), Canadian ice hockey coach
Terence Garvin (born 1991), American football player
Viola Garvin (1898-1968), English poet and editor

Given name:
Garvin Alston (born 1971), Major League Baseball right-handed pitcher
Garvin Bushell (1902–1991), American woodwind multi-instrumentalist
Garvin Cross, stuntman and actor
Garvin Roberts (born 1982), West Indian cricketer
Garvin Eddy (born 1950) Emmy Winning Production Designer best known for Roseanne, The Cosby Show and That 70's Show

Fictional characters:
Willie Garvin, character in comic strip Modesty Blaise

References